Neath is a nigh-coastal town in the South Wales Valleys.

Neath may also refer to:

South Wales
 River Neath, through Powys and Neath Port Talbot
Vale of Neath, its surrounding valley
 Neath (UK Parliament constituency)
 Neath (Senedd constituency)
 Neath RFC, Wales' oldest rugby club
 Neath F.C., a defunct, association football club (2005–2012)

Elsewhere
 Neath, New South Wales, Australian outer suburb of the City of Cessnock
 Neath, Pennsylvania, United States